KXFM (99.1 FM, "Old School 99.1") is a commercial radio station that is licensed to Santa Maria, California and serves the Santa Maria-Lompoc area. Owned by Point Broadcasting (through licensee Point Ten), the station broadcasts a rhythmic oldies music format and is a part of Point's Old School network of oldies stations.

History
KXFM first signed on December 1, 1964.

On February 3, 2014, KXFM adjusted its previous classic rock format to mainstream rock, adding more recent songs and positioning itself as "Real Rock for the Central Coast".

In May 2016, El Dorado Broadcasters sold KXFM to Point Broadcasting for $1.175 million. Following the closing of the sale on August 31, KXFM flipped to rhythmic oldies, airing the "Old School" format found on Point sister stations KOCP in Oxnard and KQIE in Redlands.

References

External links

XFM
Santa Maria, California
Rhythmic oldies radio stations in the United States